Mausdale is an unincorporated community in Montour County, in the U.S. state of Pennsylvania.

History
Mausdale was named after the local Mau family of German heritage.

References

Unincorporated communities in Pennsylvania
Unincorporated communities in Montour County, Pennsylvania